HD 23514, is a star in the Pleiades. It is a main-sequence star of class F6, and has been seen to have hot dust particles orbiting around it. These materials, otherwise known as planetesimals which orbit within a circumstellar disc, are evidence of possible planetary formation. The debris disk shows evidence of being rich in silica.

The star system itself is very young, in the 35~100 million years range, meaning that it is very well likely at the stage of forming planets.

HD 23514 has a brown dwarf companion (HD 23154 B), estimated to have a mass of about 0.06 ± 0.01 solar masses and a temperature of 2,600 ± 100K, and separated by about 360 AU from the primary. The spectra of HD 23154 B have been found to have features typical of late-M dwarfs, including FeH absorption, strong CO bands and Na I absorption, and a near-infrared spectral type of M8 ± 1 has been proposed.

The star will be continuously studied to confirm whether it may be a potential candidate for planetary formation.

References

F-type main-sequence stars
Taurus (constellation)
023514
Pleiades Open Cluster
BD+22 0550